The Cheadle by-election, in Greater Manchester, England, was caused by the death of Patsy Calton, the Liberal Democrat Member of Parliament (MP) for Cheadle on 29 May 2005. The election was held on 14 July 2005.

The Liberal Democrat candidate succeeding Calton was Stockport council leader Mark Hunter. The  Conservative candidate was Stephen Day (who held the seat from 1987 to 2001, and lost to Calton in the 2005 general election).  In his victory speech, Hunter described the campaign of the Conservatives as 'nasty' and 'misleading'.

The campaign was marred by accusations of dirty tricks and ruthless negative campaigning, principally accusing the Conservative campaign. Both the Liberal Democrats and a local newspaper threatened legal action over inaccuracies and defamation in Conservative campaign leaflets. The most significant example was a Conservative leaflet that superimposed a headline about Hunter's voting record on crime with a headline from a local newspaper about a rape, prompting the Liberal Democrats to threaten legal action. With only 4.6% of the vote the Labour Party candidate, Martin Miller, lost his deposit; Labour did not fight an energetic campaign in a seat that was a Liberal Democrat/Conservative marginal.

With the exception of the 1997 Winchester by-election, where the General Election result was annulled, it was the first seat to be defended in a by-election by the Liberal Democrats since their formation in 1988. Their predecessor parties last defended a seat in a by-election at Truro in 1987.

Result

See also
 List of United Kingdom by-elections

Notes

External links
Campaign literature from the by-election
Lib Dems win Cheadle - BBC News
Lib Dems name Cheadle candidate - BBC News
Lib Dems reveal by-election date
UKIP to miss Cheadle by-election

2005 elections in the United Kingdom
2005 in England
2000s in Greater Manchester
By-elections to the Parliament of the United Kingdom in Greater Manchester constituencies
Politics of the Metropolitan Borough of Stockport
July 2005 events in the United Kingdom